Burj Daman is a 65-floor tower in the Dubai International Financial Centre in Dubai, United Arab Emirates. The building is to have a total structural height of 235 m (771 ft). The building topped out in 2011, construction of Rosewood Dubai completed in 2014 and then rebranded to Waldorf Astoria Dubai International Financial Centre  in June 2019. The building is now (March 2016) the 44th tallest in Dubai.

See also 
 List of tallest buildings in Dubai
 List of tallest buildings in the United Arab Emirates

References

External links
Emporis
CTBUH
Skyscraperpage

Residential skyscrapers in Dubai
Skyscraper office buildings in Dubai